"Happy Now" is a song by German music producer Zedd and American singer Elley Duhé. Written by Noonie Bao, Sarah Aarons and its producers Zedd and Lotus IV, the song was released by Interscope Records on 18 July 2018.

Background
Initially titled "Are You Happy Now" featuring Norwegian singer Sigrid, the song was first revealed during a cover shoot interview in 2017 with Billboard magazine. On 3 July 2018, Zedd debuted the song at his Zedd in the Park festival, where he brought Elley Duhé on stage for a live performance. Duhé posted a short video of the performance on social media with the caption: "Not gonna lie my [heart] is pretty full". Zedd officially announced the song's release date and unveiled its cover art on 13 July, and later teased the lyrics in multiple tweets. He premiered the song on Zane Lowe's Beats 1 radio show as the World Record of the day.

During the radio interview, Zedd explained the reason behind working with Duhé: "I think why I really gravitated towards her was that she had a genuine and honest approach to the song and she felt vulnerable and real." Duhé said of the song in a press statement: "To me, 'Happy Now' is more than just a song. It's a significant moment in my life, the golden opportunity to work with one of the greatest DJ's/producer of our time. Being able to come together with complete strangers to do something beautiful, sing something meaningful, to share something special is what 'Happy Now' is all about."

Composition
"Happy Now" is a post-breakup pop ballad, stylized as a "vocal-centric pop/electronic hybrid". It opens with an acoustic guitar line, before becoming "a bounding, chiming pile of percussion", eventually ending with "Zedd's signature robotic voice". The drop features a "memorable beat" composed of "whimsical, multi-toned synths cascading in mid-tempo, mellifluous breakdowns". In a press release, Zedd regarded "Happy Now" as "the most organic sounding song [he has] made in a long time", noting that the majority of the song was recorded using real instrumentation, specifically "a lot of pianos and a lot of guitars". Lyrically, he described the song as "both happy and sad at the same time", while musically, the song "rather leans towards a happier, sunnier side".

Remixes
On September 21st, 2018, the official remix EP was released consisting of 5 remixes from DJ Marc Benjamin, DJ duo BEAUZ, DJ duo Duke & Jones, DJ MXXWLL & DJ duo Magnificence.

Critical reception
Rachel Narozniak of Dancing Astronaut called the song a representation of "yet another sonic step in a direction opposite the high-powered electro constructions of earlier foundational singles like "Clarity" and "Stay the Night'". She noticed a more minimalist melodic arrangement in the song than that in "Stay" or "The Middle".

Personnel
Credits adapted from Tidal.
 Zedd – production, mixing
 Elley Duhé – vocals
 Lotus IV – production
 Mike Marsh – master engineering

Charts

Weekly charts

Year-end charts

Certifications

Release history

References

External links
 
 

2010s ballads
2018 singles
2018 songs
Zedd songs
Elley Duhé songs
Interscope Records singles
Pop ballads
Songs written by Eric Barber
Songs written by Linus Wiklund
Songs written by Noonie Bao
Songs written by Sarah Aarons
Songs written by Zedd